Artyom Mikaelyan (born 12 July 1991) is an Armenian international footballer who plays for Shirak, as a defender.

Career

Club
Mikaelyan has played club football for Shirak.

International
Mikaelyan made his international debut for Armenia in 2017.

Career statistics

Club

International

Statistics accurate as of match played 9 November 2017

References

1991 births
Living people
Armenian footballers
Armenia international footballers
Armenian Premier League players
FC Shirak players
Association football defenders